USS Medusa may refer to the following ships operated by the United States Navy:

 , was the single‑turreted monitor Nantucket renamed Medusa 15 June 1869 and reassigned her original name Nantucket 10 August 1869
 , was a fleet repair ship launched 16 April 1923 and sold for scrapping 24 August 1950

United States Navy ship names